Harry Brown  (born 16 October 1903, date of death unknown) was an Australian rules footballer who played with St Kilda in the Victorian Football League (VFL).

Brown played for Camberwell Football Club in 1928.

Notes

External links 

Year of death missing
1903 births
Australian rules footballers from Victoria (Australia)
St Kilda Football Club players
Camberwell Football Club players